"Leave Them Alone" is a 1994 song by the Dutch band Twenty 4 Seven, released as the last single from the album, Slave to the Music in many other countries. This was the last Twenty 4 Seven song to reach the top 10 in the Netherlands, peaking at number 9. In Spain, the single was very popular and peaked at number 6. On the Eurochart Hot 100, it reached number 39. "Leave Them Alone" was released in the US instead of "Is It Love" and "Take Me Away". The album version is sung by Stay-C, but on the single mix Stay-C performs the rap part. The single included a Greatest Hits Mega-mix and a '94 version of "I Can't Stand It!".

Track listing

CD maxi
Netherlands
 "Leave Them Alone" (Rap Single Mix)               – 3:34
 "Leave Them Alone" (RVR Long Version Rap)         – 4:30
 "I Can't Stand It '94" (The 1994 Remake)          – 5:19
 "Greatest Hits Megamix"                           – 13:15
 "Slave to the Music" (Ferry & Garnefsky Club Mix) – 5:02
 "Is It Love" (Dancability Club Mix)               – 5:04
 "Take Me Away" (E & M Club Mix)                   – 5:03
 "Leave Them Alone" (RVR Version)                  – 4:05

Germany
 "Leave Them Alone" (Factory Team Remix)           – 5:50
 "Leave Them Alone" (Factory Club Edit)            – 5:52
 "Leave Them Alone" (Factory Spanish Remix)        – 5:40
 "Leave Them Alone" (Radio Edit)                   – 4:15
 "Leave Them Alone" (El Tzigano)                   – 5:38

Australia
 "Leave Them Alone" (Rap Single Mix)               – 3:34
 "Leave Them Alone" (RVR Long Version Rap)         – 4:30
 "I Can't Stand It '94" (The 1994 Remake)          – 5:19
 "Greatest Hits Megamix"                           – 13:15
 "Slave to the Music" (Ferry & Garnefsky Club Mix) – 5:02
 "Is It Love" (Dancability Club Mix)               – 5:04
 "Take Me Away" (E & M Club Mix)                   – 5:03
 "Leave Them Alone" (RVR Version)                  – 4:05

CD maxi
US
 "Leave Them Alone" (Album Version)                – 3:59
 "Leave Them Alone" (Rap Single Mix)               – 3:30
 "Leave Them Alone" (RVR Long Version Rap)         – 4:25
 "Leave Them Alone" (Factory Team Remix)           – 5:45
 "Leave Them Alone" (Factory Spanish Remix)        – 5:38
 "Keep On Goin'"                                   – 3:56

Greatest Hits Megamix
 "Slave to the Music" (Ferry & Garnefsky Mix)      – 3:09
 "Is It Love" (Dancability Club Mix)               – 3:20
 "Take Me Away" (E & M Club Mix)                   – 2:58
 "Leave Them Alone" (RVR Version)                  – 3:33

CD single
Netherlands
 "Leave Them Alone" (Rap Single Mix)               – 3:34
 "Leave Them Alone" (Album Version)                – 3:46

France
 "Leave Them Alone" (Rap Single Mix)               – 3:34
 "Leave Them Alone" (Album Version)                – 3:46

12" vinyl
Italy
 "Leave Them Alone" (Factory Club Edit)            – 5:52
 "Leave Them Alone" (Factory Team Remix)           – 5:50
 "Leave Them Alone" (Factory Spanish Remix)        – 5:40
 "Leave Them Alone" (Radio Edit)                   – 4:15
 "Leave Them Alone" (El Tzigano)                   – 5:38

Charts

Weekly charts

Year-end charts

References

1994 singles
Twenty 4 Seven songs
1993 songs
CNR Music singles
ZYX Music singles
Songs against racism and xenophobia
Songs written by Ruud van Rijen